Kosmos 9 ( meaning Cosmos 9), also known as Zenit-2 No.7, was a Soviet reconnaissance satellite launched in 1962. It was the ninth satellite to be designated under the Kosmos system, and the third successful launch of a Soviet reconnaissance satellite, following Kosmos 4 and Kosmos 7.

Spacecraft
Kosmos 9 was a Zenit-2 satellite, a first generation, low resolution photo reconnaissance payload. A reconnaissance satellite derived from the Vostok spacecraft used for crewed flights. In addition to reconnaissance, it was also used for research into radiation in support of the Vostok programme.

Mission
The Vostok-2, s/n T15000-06, was used to launch Kosmos 9. The launch was conducted from Site 1/5 at the Baikonur Cosmodrome, and occurred at 09:39:51 GMT on 27 September 1962. It conducted a four-day mission, before being deorbited and landing by parachute on 1 October 1962, and recovered by the Soviet forces in the steppe in Kazakhstan.

The next Zenit-2 launch will be Kosmos 10.

See also

 1962 in spaceflight

References

Spacecraft launched in 1962
1962 in the Soviet Union
Kosmos satellites
Spacecraft which reentered in 1962